The Nanjundeshwara Temple (also called Srikanteshwara Temple) is an ancient temple dedicated to Shiva in the Hindu pilgrimage town of Nanjanagudu in Karnataka, India. It is located on the right bank of river Kapila, a tributary of the Kaveri. Nanjangudu is also known as "Dakshina Prayaga" or "Prayag of South".

Nanju in Kannada means poison; the name Nanjundeshwara means the "God who Drank the Poison" (halahala), a word that has its origins in the legend of the Great Churning of the Ocean of Milk; thus, the town got the name 'Nanjangudu' which means "the abode of the god Nanjundeshwara".

The "Dodda Jaathre" festival at Nanjangud by the temple attracts thousands of devotees. The festivities in the fair include five colourful chariots pulled by devotees on a path called the ratha beedi. Parasurama temple is near Nanjundeshwara temple.

The nine-storied, 120 feet tall temple Gopuram and its extensive exterior were built by Devarajammanni, the queen of the Mysore king Krishnaraja Wadiyar III.

History
Nanjungud is mentioned as Sri Garalapuri, in the Shiva Purana. It is said that the legendary holy place is the abode of Shiva in southern India. It is also referred to as Dakshina Kasi, where the god had appeared at the plea of his devotees, the Devas and sage Narada. The demon Keshi obtained a boon from Brahma and Vishnu by which they would not be able to kill him. He assumed that with this boon, he was as good as immortal and began troubling the people, the Devas, and the sages. At last, Narada and the Devas pleaded with Shiva to save everyone. He appeared in Garalapuri Sri Kshetra (present Nanjungud) and killed the demon Keshi. He further assured that his Ansh - a part of his divine self would always remain here and bless humanity. The place henceforth would be a papa vinashini – remover of sins. After bathing in the holy river of Kabini, every human praying to Lord Srikanteshwara or Nanjundeshwara (Shiva) of Nanjungud would be rid of sins and blessed by the god.
 
Sage Parashuram, after beheading his mother as per his father Sage Jamadagni's orders, wanted to undo his sins from "Matru Hatya" - his mother's murder. Per Narada's advice, he reached Garalapuri (Nangangud) and prayed to Sri Nanjundeshwara Swamy. Shiva appeared and advised him to build a Mantapa and perform pooja to the Shivlinga. While clearing the shrubs with his Parashu – axe, unconsciously, Parashuram's axe hit the Shivlinga, and the tip of the Shivlinga began bleeding. Sage Parashuram felt very guilty and said, "I have committed another unforgivable sin; only by killing myself shall I be relieved from all my sins", and prepared to kill himself. Shiva appeared and blessed sage Parashuram and told him to apply wet mud upon the Shivling (the mud of Sri Nanjangud has immense healing powers). The Shivlinga stopped bleeding. Lord Shiva advised Parashuram to build the mantapa and continue his penance. Finally, Parashuram was relieved from all his sins and blessed with immortality. Goddess Parvati consort of Shiva, wanted to visit this holy place. He brought her to Garalapuri Nanjanagud. Devi went to the Kabini river and bent down to touch the water. A gemstone bead – Mani fell off from her crown into the water. Lord Shiva was pleased and declared, "Devi, until now, the place had my divine blessings and presence; from this moment, it shall have your presence, grace and blessings, too. It shall also be called Dakshina Manikarnika Ghat". 

During the reign of King Tipu Sultan, his royal elephant became blind. As per the advice of his minister, Sri Poornayya, Tipu sent the elephant to the Nanjundeshwara Swamy temple and performed 48 days of rituals. On the 48th day, the elephant's vision was restored. Tipu Sultan offered the emerald green Shivlinga as a token of gratitude to Sri Nanjundeshwara Swamy and called Lord Shiva "Hakim Nanjunda" (healer).

Gallery

See also
Samudra manthan

References

Shiva temples in Karnataka
Hindu temples in Mysore district